ELC English Language Center is a privately operated group of boutique language schools that provide English language training in the United States. It operates through various language centers, in Los Angeles, Boston and Santa Barbara. ELC opened its first center in 1978. ELC has been accredited by ACCET (Accrediting Council for Continuing Education and Training). ELC Los Angeles, ELC Boston, and ELC Santa Barbara  are all authorized by the US Department of Homeland Security to Issue SEVIS Form I-20.
ELC is often used by international students to improve their English for gap year study, career transitions, or to prepare for study at a U.S. university. ELC has a proprietary curriculum, which has a structure that accommodates multi-level placement, and 12 levels of instruction. Certain locations also offer TOEFL, IELTS and Cambridge ESOL preparation and testing. ELC Los Angeles and ELC Boston are both authorized IELTS test centers. ELC is owned and operated in the United States.

Programs

ELC programs include several intensive English programs including General English, Test Preparation, Academic Programs, and Business English Courses. ELC Programs also include a number of part-time programs including Summer Junior Programs, Winter Junior Programs, 50+ Programs, and English Plus Programs.

Notable alumni

Alex and PJ (YouTube Stars) 
Manuel Martin Cuenca (Film Director)
Ana de Armas (Actress)
Serkan Uysal (Basketball Player) 
Reiko Fujimoto (daughter of former Japanese Prime Minister)
Yuriy Trogiyanov (professional boxer and kickboxing champion)
Ximena Diaz (Socialite)

Historical timeline

1970s and 1980s
ELC English Language Center was founded as an English education institute in Los Angeles, in 1978.
1990s
ELC English Language Center opens its second location In Boston, Massachusetts in 1990.
ELC Boston teaches many of the Boston Bruins English.
ELC opens its first residential summer program on campus at the University of California, Los Angeles in 1995
2000s
ELC Harvard Square opens in a location above Harvard Square.
ELC opens its second residential summer program at Suffolk University in downtown Boston, and its third residential summer program at UCSB in Goleta, CA.
2010s
ELC opens its fourth summer residential program at MIT.
ELC Santa Barbara opens on State Street.
ELC hosts the IALC 2017 conference in Boston.

References

External links 
 ELC English Language Center homepage: http://www.elc.edu/

Language schools in the United States
Schools of English as a second or foreign language